Diadegma melanium is a wasp first described by Carl Gustaf Thomson in 1887. It is a member of the genus Diadegma and family Ichneumonidae. It inhabits Sweden. No subspecies are listed.

References 

melanium

Insects described in 1887